Somerset is an unincorporated community in Person County, North Carolina, United States, located approximately five miles (8 km) west of Surl and 2.5 mi (4 km) south of Roxboro.

References

 

Unincorporated communities in Person County, North Carolina
Unincorporated communities in North Carolina